Geranium carolinianum is a species of geranium known by the common name Carolina crane's-bill,  or Carolina geranium.  This species is native to North America, where it is widespread and grows in many types of habitat. There are two varieties; Geranium carolinianum var. carolinianum and the Geranium carolinianum var. sphaerospermum. This is a summer or winter annual herb. It can be considered invasive depending on the region, when it is found in the United States it is considered to be native.

The USDA has specific symbols or coding labeled for each plant in their database. For the Geranium carolinianum, it is GECAC4.

Description 
The plant has erect stems covered in spiky hairs. The color of the stem is typically pink to red. There are two leaves per node on each stem, called opposite leaves. The stem is not succulent and not nutrient-rich as a source of calories for herbivores.

The palmate leaves are several centimeters wide, ranging between 3–8 cm.  with a growth pattern of alternate, and usually divided into five segments which are each subdivided into elegantly pointed lobes and secondary lobes; they can be toothed or the leaves can be cleft. The leaf color can also appear grayish-green due to fine pubescent hairs that are present on the leaves.

The inflorescence is a cluster of one to several small flowers. Each flower has five-pointed sepals which can be as long as the petals, and five-notched petals in shades of white, light pink to lavender. This is a distinguishing factor for discriminating G. carolinianum from other species of Geranium. The flowers form in short tight clusters which grow off the main stems. The anthers do not have nectar spurs. The carpels have hair and are fused together. There are five carpels and one pistil. The petals are rounded. The color of the sepals is green to brown; they are ovate. Despite being thin, dry and paper-like, the sepals are flexible. The plant does not persist after flowering. Flowers of G. carolinianum bloom in late May to July. They do not give off any strong aroma or scent to attract pollinators into visiting the flower, but rather depend on visual stimuli for insects to be attracted for the benefit of the naturally produced sap.

The fruit has a hairy body and a style up to 1.5 centimeters long; it can grow to a length of 5mm. The fruit of the plant has long beak-like structures giving the plant its nickname of "Cranesbill." The seed surfaces are finely reticulated. The seeds have pits or depressions in them and are wingless. The fruit is dry, and does not split open when ripened. The root system of  Geranium carolinium is a taproot structure that can grow to a depth of 15 centimeters. The plant has a superior ovary.

Range and Distribution 
Geranium carolinianum is found throughout much of the continental United States, from the New England region south to Central Mexico and along the Eastern coast. The plant likes arid areas that are nutrient-poor and have little competition, such as  clay and limestone prairies, lawns and roadsides, as well as abandoned fields and farmlands.

The pH that the Geranium carolinianum can survive in, is relatively high comparatively; the pH that is suitable for most plants is considerably lower. The plant can be found in conditions that are inhospitable to most plants as long as there is water available within reason.

Medicinal Applications 
There is potential for Geranium carolinianum to fight Hepatitis B. The ethanol extracted from the plant has been effective in treating inflammatory issues as well. The presence of the anti-HBV compounds in the geraniin, ellagic acid and hyperin in G. carolinianum L. might account for the effectiveness of this folk medicine in the treatment of HBV infections.

Cultivation 
Geranium carolinianum enjoys soils that do not have excessive competition. It does well in very bright to partial sunshine places. The plant may be considered invasive in multiple states, each depending on the growth and distribution of the plant. In Kentucky, New York, and Illinois Carolina Cransbill is considered  invasive because it grows rampantly, and can smother desirable plants. It is self-seeding and can survive being transplanted from one location to another in cultivation.

Wildlife use
Insect visitors that have been observed collecting nectar include long-tongued bees (Megachile spp.), short-tongued bees (Halictid bees), and flower flies (Syrphids) who, in the larval stage, can provide early, cool-season aphid control. Northern Bobwhite Quails as well as Mourning Doves are known to eat the seeds of the plant. It is also a preferred winter forage for White-tailed Deer in the Southeast, with an average of 19 percent crude protein in the vegetative state.

References

External links
Jepson Manual Treatment
Photo gallery

carolinianum
Flora of North America
Plants described in 1753
Taxa named by Carl Linnaeus